Siju Cave, also known as Bat Cave in English, is located in the North East Indian state of Meghalaya near the Napak Lake and Simsang River game reserve. It is a  limestone cave and is famous for its stalagmites and stalactites. 

The Siju cave-system is more than 4 kilometres long, but nearly all of it is filled with water and inaccessible. The limestone hills of Meghalaya receive a lot of rain and moisture and holds many other cave-systems, some of them much longer and larger than Siju, but Siju Cave is among the most thoroughly researched and explored systems.

In 1927, it was found that the Siju caves have a constant temperature of 21–26.4 °C.

Biodiversity and faunistic composition
 Arachnida: Opilionida, Schizomida
 Myriapoda: Diplopoda Julida, Decapoda Natantia
 Crustacea: Isopoda Oniscidea
 Collembola: Entomobryomorpha
 Insecta: Orthoptera

Some rare bat species live in these caves.

See also 
 Caves of Meghalaya

Literature

References

External links 
 Meghalaya Tourism: Siju Cave

Caves of Meghalaya